Manuel Pedro Pacavira (14 October 1939 – 12 September 2016) was the ambassador of Angola to Italy, the United Nations Food and Agriculture Organization (FAO), the International Fund for Agriculture and Development (IFAD) and the World Food Program. He previously served as Transportation Minister. He succeeded Elísio de Figueiredo as ambassador to the United Nations in 1988, serving until 1991.

Pacavira, born in Cuanza Norte, Angola, studied in Havana, Cuba. He published a book on President Jose Eduardo Dos Santos, Jose Eduardo dos Santos - A Life Devoted to the Homeland, in August 2006.

See also
Angolan Civil War

References

External links
AllAfrica- "Angola: Italy - Angolan Ambassador Hails Cabinda Peace Accord" 4 August 2006

1939 births
Permanent Representatives of Angola to the United Nations
Angolan writers
Living people
People from Cuanza Norte Province
Governors of Cuanza Norte
Agriculture ministers of Angola
Ambassadors of Angola to Cuba
Ambassadors of Angola to Italy